KBS Hanminjok Radio is a South Korean anti-communist propaganda radio channel of the Korean Broadcasting System. It is the only channel that does not have FM frequency in South Korea. Until 2007 it was called as KBS Social Education Radio. It has two channels, but Hanminjok 2 Radio, the second channel usually relays the same programme with Hanminjok 1 Radio.

Until the mid-2000's it broadcast content criticizing the North Korean system, but halted them after Inter-Korean summits. After its name was changed, the audience has been expanded not only to North Koreans but also to Hanminjok (Koreans) living in China, Japan, Taiwan and Russia.

Frequency and air time

See also 

 Propaganda in South Korea
 KBS World Radio

References 

Radio stations in South Korea
Korean Broadcasting System radio networks
Korean-language radio stations
Radio stations established in 1972
Propaganda in South Korea